Thomas Campbell (born c. 1969) is a California-based visual artist, filmmaker, sculptor and photographer whose work has appeared on the Ugly Casanova album Sharpen Your Teeth and in Juxtapoz Magazine's September 2006 issue.

Thomas grew up surfing and skating in southern California before moving to New York in the 1980s. In that setting he came to know and be associated with the artists that would go on to make up San Francisco's Mission School painters and the generation that would be at least loosely defined by the Beautiful Losers exhibition in 2004.

His first feature-length surf film, The Seedling, came out in 1999; his second release was a film called Sprout in 2004, and his third surf film is called The Present, released in 2009.

References

External links
Thomas Campbell bibliography: 
Haven Collective article: 

20th-century American painters
American male painters
21st-century American painters
21st-century American male artists
Living people
American photographers
20th-century American sculptors
20th-century American male artists
American male sculptors
1969 births